William Hamilton (1930 – 23 November 2017) was a Canadian cyclist. He competed in the team pursuit event at the 1948 Summer Olympics.

References

1930 births
2017 deaths
Canadian male cyclists
Commonwealth Games competitors for Canada
Cyclists at the 1950 British Empire Games
Olympic cyclists of Canada
Cyclists at the 1948 Summer Olympics
Sportspeople from Oshawa